Lily Post (1856-1899) was an American actress and operatic soprano in the 1880s and 1890s. She appeared on stage with Marie Jansen, Fanny Rice, and Mathilde Cottrelly. She sang music by Edward Solomon and Signor Perugini, two men who had been married to Lillian Russell. In 1893 she introduced a pop piece called Momma's Love Song.

In January 1890 Post was granted a divorce from her husband Frank Blair. They had one child and the issue of child support became a factor as Blair did not want to pay support as Post was rich from her theatrical earnings.

She entered a sanitarium or insane asylum on April 3, 1899 in San Francisco having been admitted there by her son. She had been called demented in the press of the day. She died April 4, 1899 having been stricken with a heart attack.

Some works
The Queen's Lace Handkerchief (1882–83)
The Black Hussar (1885)

References

External links
Lily Post at Internet Broadway Database
portraits of Lily Post with Marie Jansen in The Black Hussar 1885 (City Museum of New York)

1856 births
1899 deaths
American opera singers
19th-century American actresses
American stage actresses